The Ukrainian men's national junior ice hockey team is the national under-20 ice hockey team in Ukraine. The team represents Ukraine at the International Ice Hockey Federation's World Junior Hockey Championship Division I.

History 
Ukraine made its first appearance at the top level in 1994, less than five years after gaining independence from the Soviet Union. Ukraine went on to upset the United States, and Ukrainian goaltender Igor Karpenko went on to win top goaltender at the 1995 World Junior Ice Hockey Championships. Since, there was no relegation round due to the restructuring of the format, in 2001 Junior Ice Hockey Championship the team were participating at the German performance, like a strong and high level players team, from small country of the east Europe. In that year Team Ukraine got a 3rd place rank and deserved  bronze medals of the Division I tournament. This group played in Landsberg and Füssen, Germany between December 10 and December 16, 2000.

The best players of the team Ukraine -"Yuriy Dyachenko" and "Alexandr Bobkin" best of 5 points results 3 scores and 2 assists for both 10 points in summary. Ukraine was not relegated, despite finishing 8th out of 8 teams. Ukraine was relegated to Pool B after finishing 10th in 1996. Four years later, Ukraine made it back to Pool A in 2000, and once again finished 10th. Despite, the relegation, Ukraine didn't lose a game by more than 7 goals. Ukraine earned promotion to top level for 2004 with a one-point differential over Japan, by defeating France 3-0 on the last day. Ukraine experienced troubles in Helsinki, Finland with equipment shortages (ea-sticks, tape), because the country was experiencing economic difficulties. Other teams participating donated sticks, tape, skate laces, and other pieces of equipment to the Ukrainian team. Despite, the generous donations from other teams, Ukraine did not hold up well in the tournament losing to the Czech-Republic (8-0); Switzerland (11-0); Canada (10-0); Finland (14-1). Ukraine went on to lose the relegation round to Sweden (4-0), and tie Austria (2-2). Ukraine has remained at the Division I level since then.

International competitions

External links
Ukraine at IIHF.com

I
Junior national ice hockey teams